Yulfira Barkah (born 4 February 1998) is an Indonesian badminton player from Medan, North Sumatra, who trained at the Mutiara Cardinal Bandung club. She was part of the national junior team that won the bronze medal at the 2015 Asian Junior Championships, later won the girls' doubles bronze at the 2016 World Junior Championships. Barkah claimed her first international title at the 2016 Smiling Fish International in the women's doubles event partnered with Suci Rizky Andini.

Achievements

BWF World Junior Championships 
Girls' doubles

BWF World Tour (1 title) 
The BWF World Tour, which was announced on 19 March 2017 and implemented in 2018, is a series of elite badminton tournaments sanctioned by the Badminton World Federation (BWF). The BWF World Tour is divided into levels of World Tour Finals, Super 1000, Super 750, Super 500, Super 300 (part of the HSBC World Tour), and the BWF Tour Super 100.

Women's doubles

BWF International Challenge/Series (3 titles, 2 runners-up) 
Women's doubles

Mixed doubles

  BWF International Challenge tournament
  BWF International Series tournament

Performance timeline

National team 
 Junior level

Individual competitions

Junior level 
 Girls' doubles

 Mixed doubles

Senior level

Women's doubles

Mixed doubles

References

External links 

 

1998 births
Living people
Sportspeople from Medan
Indonesian female badminton players
20th-century Indonesian women
21st-century Indonesian women